Joseph Ramiro Vasquez (born March 20, 1969) is a Mexican-American former soccer player who played three seasons with the Los Angeles Galaxy.

Player

Youth
Vasquez graduated from Santa Ana High School and attended Santa Ana College, a two year, community college in California. He played soccer both years (1989 and 1990). He was inducted into the Santa Ana Athletic Hall of Fame in 2007.

Professional
In 1991, Vasquez began his professional career with Mexican club  C.D. Guadalajara before moving to Club Atlas in 1992. In 1993, he returned to the United States to sign with the Los Angeles Salsa of the American Professional Soccer League.  He spent two seasons with the Salsa. In 1995, he played for the Anaheim Splash in the Continental Indoor Soccer League. Vasquez was invited by the Los Angeles Galaxy to attend the team’s 1996 pre-season training camp. He impressed the coaching staff and was offered a contract.  Vasquez lost much of the season with a broken foot and the Galaxy released him in February 1997. Vasquez moved to the Orange County Zodiac an A-League team associated with the Galaxy. On July 2, 1997, the Galaxy called Vasquez up from the Zodiac.  Vasquez played the next two seasons with the Galaxy, briefly going on loan to the MLS Pro 40 in 1998. The Galaxy waived him on April 3, 1999.  Vasquez then rejoined the Zodiac for the rest of the season.

Coach
During his playing career, Vasquez also coached high school teams, including Santa Ana High School, Orange High School, Katella High School with success of winning CIF championships in the years of 2006 and 2007 . In 1992, he became an assistant coach at Santa Ana College. In 2004, Vasquez became head coach at Santa Ana.  He took the Dons to the top ranking in the nation and was the 2004 junior college Coach of the Year.

References

External links
 

Living people
1969 births
American soccer players
American Professional Soccer League players
Anaheim Splash players
C.D. Guadalajara footballers
Continental Indoor Soccer League players
Atlas F.C. footballers
LA Galaxy players
Orange County Blue Star players
Los Angeles Salsa players
Major League Soccer players
MLS Pro-40 players
A-League (1995–2004) players
American sportspeople of Mexican descent
Association football defenders
Association football forwards